

References

1984
Soviet
Films